The Fairview City Hall is a historic building in Fairview, Utah. It was built by Oscar Amundson in 1936 as the city hall of Fairview under the Public Works Administration program, and designed by architect Hugh Anderson. It has been listed on the National Register of Historic Places since April 9, 1986.

References

City and town halls on the National Register of Historic Places in Utah
National Register of Historic Places in Sanpete County, Utah
Moderne architecture in the United States
Buildings and structures completed in 1936
1936 establishments in Utah